West Roxbury is a neighborhood in Boston, Massachusetts bordered by Roslindale and Jamaica Plain to the northeast, the town of Brookline to the north, the city of Newton to the northwest and the towns of Dedham and Needham to the southwest.  West Roxbury is often mistakenly confused with Roxbury, but, by around 6 miles, the two are not connected. West Roxbury is separated from Roxbury by Jamaica Plain and Roslindale.

Pre-1630: Area is inhabited by the Wampanoag Indian Tribe.

Founded in 1630 (contemporaneously with Boston), West Roxbury was originally part of the town of Roxbury and was mainly used as farmland. West Roxbury seceded from Roxbury in 1851, and was annexed by Boston in 1874. The town included the neighborhoods of Jamaica Plain and Roslindale.

West Roxbury's main commercial thoroughfare is Centre Street. West Roxbury Main Streets is a local non-profit that works to enhance and promote the business district. The neighborhood has some two-family houses but mostly single family homes; many of Boston's civil servants live there.

West Roxbury is home to District E-5 of the Boston Police Department, Boston Emergency Medical Services Ambulance 5 that posts at the intersection of West Roxbury Parkway at Centre St and Paramedic 5 stationed at the Faulkner Hospital provide EMS service, and there are two Boston fire stations, Ladder 25 & Engine 30 on Centre Street and Engine 55 on Washington Street. The Needham Branch of the MBTA Commuter Rail network has three stations in West Roxbury (Bellevue, Highland and West Roxbury). Several MBTA bus lines run through and/or terminate in West Roxbury. A large Veterans Affairs hospital is located opposite the Charles River on the VFW Parkway near the Dedham line. West Roxbury is home to several places of worship, including three Catholic parishes, churches of various Protestant denominations, and a Jewish synagogue.

The neighborhood was home to an experimental transcendentalist Utopian community called Brook Farm, which attracted notable figures including Margaret Fuller and Nathaniel Hawthorne, whose 1852 novel The Blithedale Romance is based on his stay there.

Like its neighboring communities, West Roxbury's residential development grew with the construction of the West Roxbury branch of the Boston and Providence Railroad; the area grew further with the development of electric streetcars.

Demographics
Until the 2000 census West Roxbury's population had been recorded as declining slightly, but it increased at the 2010 census. This could be due to more rigorous counting procedures instituted by the City of Boston and Massachusetts in an unsuccessful attempt to avoid losing the state's tenth congressional seat.
2010 Census 30,446  (4.9% of 617,594 citywide)
2000 Census 28,663  (4.9% of 589,141 citywide)
1990 Census 29,706  (5.2% of 574,383 citywide)
1980 Census 31,333
Population growth/decline, 2000–2010: +6.2%
Population growth/decline, 1990–2000: -3.51%
Population growth/decline, 1980–1990: -5.19%

West Roxbury has historically been a heavily Irish Catholic neighborhood. In the twentieth century, upwardly mobile Irish Americans moved to the neighborhood from elsewhere in Boston. By the first decade of the 21st century, an influx of new residents contributed to increased ethnic diversity in the neighborhood.

The Irish Social Club of Boston, founded in Dorchester in 1945, moved its headquarters to West Roxbury in 1978, and had a membership of 15,000 in the mid-1970s. The club closed in 2011 due to financial troubles and declining membership (the club had around 300 members at the time, mostly seniors). Support from the city council and state lawmakers allowed the club to obtain a liquor license and reopen, and by 2013 the group had about 800 members.

In March 1965, an investigative study of property tax assessment practices published by the National Tax Association of 13,769 properties sold within the City of Boston under Mayor John F. Collins from January 1, 1960 to March 31, 1964 found that the assessed values in Roxbury in 1962 were at 68 percent of market values while the assessed values in West Roxbury were at 41 percent of market values, and the researchers could not find a nonracial explanation for the difference.

Theodore Parker Church
At Centre and Corey Streets, the Theodore Parker Church features seven stained glass windows made by the Tiffany Studios between 1894 and 1927. The original church, designed in 1890 by Alexander Wadsworth Longfellow Jr., is now a parish hall. Henry Seaver designed the current church in 1900. Theodore Parker (1810–1860), an advocate of progressive religious ideas, abolitionism and women's suffrage, was minister of this Unitarian congregation from 1837 to 1846.

Westerly Burying Ground conflict and secession
Westerly Burying Ground, also known as Westerly Burial Ground, (currently at Centre and LaGrange Streets) was established in 1683 to permit local burial of residents of Jamaica Plain and the western end of Roxbury. When West Roxbury was still part of Roxbury, the town's first burial place was what is today Eliot Burying Ground, near Dudley Square. This was a long distance to travel for the inhabitants of West Roxbury, and in 1683 the town selectmen voted to establish a local burying place, now known as Westerly Burying Ground. A conflict between the rural and more urbanised parts of the town led to the split of West Roxbury from Roxbury proper in 1851. West Roxbury became part of the City of Boston on 5 January 1874. Westerly Burying Ground served as this community's burial place well into the 19th century. The oldest graves contain many of the town's earliest and most prominent families. Eight veterans of the American Revolution and fifteen veterans of the American Civil War are also buried here.
War veterans interred are detailed in the article “Westerly" and the Civil War.
The site has a large collection of three centuries of funerary art. One-third of its extant gravestones date from the 18th century; almost half date from the 19th century, and about twenty from the 20th-century. Westerly Burying Ground has many individual mound tombs; mound tombs at other burying grounds are typically larger, built to contain a number of bodies. The oldest gravestone, from 1691, commemorates James and Merriam Draper, members of a prominent West Roxbury family. Headstones, skilfully carved locally, provide an historic record of three centuries of West Roxbury residents.

Boston United Hand in Hand Cemetery

Boston United Hand in Hand Cemetery is located on Centre Street straddling the Dedham line. Dating back to 1875, the original plot was full by 1896 but subsequently expanded multiple times. There are graves as recent as 1980 in the West Roxbury portion; the Dedham portion is still active. Chestnut Hill's Congregation Mishka Tefila currently owns the cemetery.

Government and infrastructure
The United States Postal Service operates the West Roxbury Post Office in West Roxbury.
West Roxbury is represented by a city councilor, Kendra Lara.

Education

Primary and secondary schools
Boston Public Schools operates public schools. Ludwig van Beethoven Elementary School, William Ohrenberger School, Joyce Kilmer K-8 School, and Patrick Lyndon K-8 School are in West Roxbury. The three schools in the West Roxbury Education Complex, Media Communications Technology High School, Parkway Academy of Technology and Health, and the Urban Science Academy were located in West Roxbury, but closed in 2019 due to structural issues in the building.

The Roxbury Latin School, a private school for boys, is located in West Roxbury. The Roman Catholic Archdiocese of Boston operates the Holy Name Parish School as well as the St. Theresa of Avila School in West Roxbury.

Catholic Memorial School, which is an all boys middle and high school, is located on Baker Street.

Public libraries

Boston Public Library operates the West Roxbury Branch Library. In 1876 the city library took over the West Roxbury Free Library, establishing a delivery station in West Roxbury. The West Roxbury facility was upgraded to a library branch in 1896. In the years of 1921 and 1922 a library building was constructed on the West Roxbury Branch Library current site. In 1973, a fire destroyed the adjacent West Roxbury Congregational Church. The land formerly occupied by the church was donated to the trustees of the library system so an addition could be built. The addition opened to the public on 24 September 1989.

Events

The Corrib Classic 5K Road Race is held annually at Billings Field, LaGrange Street, the first Sunday in June.  Since starting in 1994 with 250 runners the event has grown into the largest community event, attracting about 2000 runners, plus event volunteers, families and friends.  Centre and Lagrange Streets are briefly closed during the race.  It is a benefit event hosted by the Bligh family of the adjacent Corrib Pub and Restaurant that has raised over half a million dollars over the years for a variety of local causes.
The Parkway Little League Parade, is a small event to start little league baseball and softball for the areas of West Roxbury and Roslindale.  Young baseball and softball players dress up in their team uniforms and march from Fallon field in Roslindale to the Guy Cammarata Complex in West Roxbury.  The Shamrock Shootout is an annual street hockey tournament that takes place in West Roxbury.  The event was started in 2008 for neighborhood kids who had school off for Evacuation Day.  The tournament is free with registration.

Notable natives
 Edward Downes, musicologist and radio quizmaster
 Anthony Michael Hall
 Patrick DeCoste
 Robert Gould Shaw
 Francis A. Sullivan
 Willis Lent
 Chris Nilan, former NHL player and coach.
 Jack Rathbone, NHL player for the Vancouver Canucks
 Richard Olney, former United States Attorney General and Secretary of State.
 Dan Kiley, modernist landscape architect
 Ellery Clark, U.S. Olympic champion, Athens 1896.
 Taylor Schilling, actress
 Thomas G. Kelley, Medal of Honor recipient (Vietnam War)
 William Martin, novelist
 Rich Cronin, singer, songwriter, lead singer for LFO
 Sears Gallagher, noted American artist
 Joe Nash, former NFL player.
 Alfred Clifton Hughes, former Roman Catholic Archbishop of New Orleans.
 Kevin Hagan White,  20-year mayor of the City of Boston
 Ron Perry, Holy Cross basketball
 Nathan Blecharczyk, co-founder of Air BnB

Sites of interest
 The Roxbury Latin School
 Bellevue Standpipe, Bellevue Hill, Stony Brook Reservation
 Holy Name Parish School
 Saint Teresa of Ávila Church (Roman Catholic)
 Westerly Burial Ground
 Catholic Memorial School
 Theodore Parker Church
 Boston Public Library West Roxbury Branch
Millennium Park
 Brook Farm—1840s utopian experiment in communal living
 City of Boston Archives
 Veterans Administration Hospital
 Annunciation Melkite Catholic Cathedral Located on the VFW Parkway

See also

 Boston City Council District 6, Boston

Gallery

References

Further reading
 Sammarco, Anthony Mitchell, West Roxbury, Portsmouth, NH : Arcadia Publishing, Then & Now series, 2003, 96 pages.  . 2004, 128 pages.
A hundred comparative historic photos, 1850–2000, of the area around Centre Street.
 Sammarco, Anthony Mitchell, West Roxbury, Arcadia Publishing, Images of America series, 1997, 128 pages.
 von Hoffman, Alexander, Local Attachments, The Making of an American Urban Neighborhood (Jamaica Plain, Boston) Johns Hopkins University Press, Baltimore MD, 1994.  (paperback) 311 pages.

External links
 West Roxbury neighborhood page on City of Boston website
 West Roxbury History Page
 Guide to the Town of West Roxbury records City of Boston Archives
 1858 Map of Norfolk County by Henry F. Walling, which included West Roxbury at that time. A very large and detailed color map. Also see the detailed side map of Jamaica Plain on the top left side of the map.
 Suffolk County Atlas West Roxbury maps: 1874, 1896, 1905, 1914
 West Roxbury Historical Society
 Theodore Parker Church
 West Roxbury Branch Library
 "West Roxbury Railroad Station, 1932" – photograph, Railroad History Archive, University of Connecticut Libraries Collection.
 West Roxbury Women's Club records, 1965–1973, located in the Northeastern University Libraries, Archives and Special Collections Department, Boston, MA.

Former municipalities in Boston
Neighborhoods in Boston
Defunct towns in Massachusetts
Irish-American neighborhoods
Streetcar suburbs